Tokat Province is a province in northern Turkey. Its adjacent provinces are Amasya to the northwest, Yozgat to the southwest, Sivas to the southeast, and Ordu to the northeast. Its capital is Tokat, which lies inland of the middle Black Sea region, 422 kilometers from Ankara.

Etymology
Evliya Çelebi explained the name of the city as Tok-at in return for the satiety of horses because of its rich barley in Turkish etymology. The Ottoman historian İsmail Hakkı explained Uzunçarşılı as Toh-kat, which means "walled city", and Özhan Öztürk, in his work called Pontus, used the word "Dahyu", which means "country, chastity" in Avesta and was first used for Cappadocia in the 6th century BC during the Achaemenid Empire. He claimed that the word "Dokeia", which was corrupted in the Greek dialect, turned into Tokat in time.

History
Tokat, after remaining under the rule of the Hittites, Assyrians, Hurrians and Cimmerians, passed under the rule of Persians, Macedonians of Alexander the Great period, Capodocia Kingdom and Pontus Kingdom, which gave the name "Comana Pontica". In 65 BC, it came under the rule of the Romans and the Byzantine Empire. Tokat Castle, which has a critical importance in Byzantine-Sassanid and Byzantine-Arab wars, is located on Hisartepe, 750 meters high, in the southwest of the city, which was taken under the rule of the Danismendids (1071) after the Malazgirt Victory and later by the Anatolian Seljuks (1150). The oldest traces of Tokat Castle belong to the 5th or 6th century and it is known that the castle existed in these years.

The Armenian genocide in Tokat
For the most part of history, Tokat has been populated by Armenians and Greeks. However, after the invasion of Seljuk Turks, they slowly started becoming a minority. For most of history, Tokat has played a significant role in trade and culture within the Armenian people. 
The Armenians have built churches, schools, universities, and cities in the Tokat province. 

The Armenians were most prominent in Tokat city in the Tokat province, where the Armenians, Greeks, and Jews controlled the town's commerce up until WW1.

There used to be four Armenian churches and 2 Armenian monasteries in the city, as well as Armenian schools and other Armenian cultural places.

Oikonomides states before the Armenian and Greek Genocides, the population of Tokat city was 40,000, of which 1,000 were Greeks, 15,000 were Armenians. 
Tokat has always had a very high Christian population, and for most of history, the Christians outnumbered the Muslims. Before 1837,  it was estimated that there were 1000 Christians in the city (primarily Armenians) and only 800 Muslims. 

The Armenian genocide in Tokat raised concerns worldwide where it had the attention of international media. On several occasions, the New York Times reported on the mass killings of Armenians in Tokat, which could be found in their archives online.

After the Armenian genocide, The Armenian population was completely wiped out of the city, and their houses, business, and all their belongings were looted. To this day, some Armenian heritage could be found within the city and the region.

Geography
The city, which originates from the northern slopes of the central part of Deveci Mountains and joins Yeşilırmak on the left, is located on the slopes of a river valley, and is located at the junction of important roads connecting the Central Black Sea coast and Central and Eastern Anatolia in a very rugged region.
Total area of the province: 10.071 km². In terms of the footprint area it covers 1.3% of Turkey's land. It is 623 meters above sea level. Geographical Coordinates: Being between 39 ° 51 '- 40 ° 55' north latitudes and 35 ° 27'- 37 ° 39 'East longitudes, Tokat became a province in 1923.

Districts

Tokat province is divided into 12 districts (capital district in bold):

Landmarks
Two notable monuments in this province are the Hatuniye Külliyesi of the 15th century, built by Sultan Bayezid II, and a Seljuk bridge spanning the Yeşilırmak River, belonging to the 12th century. The Latifoğlu Mansion is a third, which is an example of the traditional architecture of a Turkish house of the 19th century, restored recently to its original state.
Tokat Castle and Zile, Niksar and Turhal castles located in Tokat district are frequented by local and foreign tourists. In the city center of Tokat, the historical Tokat Clock Tower and the historical Gök Madrasa is placed. Additionally, The Yağıbasan Madrasah, known as the first madrasah built in Anatolia, the historical Pazar Caravanserai and the Ballıca Cave are located.

Economy
The people of Tokat earn their living from agriculture, animal husbandry and trade. The city is an ideal city for a peaceful life with its regular city structure, numerous natural beauties and economic shopping conditions. Trade and industry of Tokat, whose economy is based on agriculture and animal husbandry, is concentrated in the city center. Tokat Organized Industrial Zone is the area where the city's only industrial activity continues. Again, with its geographical location, it is a city that is suitable for agriculture. In agricultural production, tomatoes, peppers, cherries, cherries, potatoes, grapes and sugar beet are the products that have the largest share in the regional production.

Climate

Gallery

References

External links 

  Tokat governor's official website
  Tokat municipality's official website
  Tokat weather forecast information
 Pictures of the capital of Tokat province, with links to others nearby

 
Provinces of Turkey